Spaceflight participant is the term used by NASA, Roscosmos, and the Federal Aviation Administration (FAA) for people who travel into space, but are not professional astronauts.

While the term gained new prominence with the rise of space tourism, it has also been used for participants in programs like NASA's Teacher in Space and astronauts designated by inter-government agreements like the Angkasawan program and the Korean Astronaut Program.

Other terms used for space travelers who are not career astronauts include NASA's Payload Specialist and the RKA's Researcher-Cosmonaut.

Background

The Soviet Interkosmos program included participants selected from Warsaw Pact members and later from allies of the USSR and non-aligned countries. Most of these people received full training for their missions and were treated as equals, but especially after the Mir program began, were generally given shorter flights than Soviet cosmonauts. The European Space Agency took advantage of the program as well.

The United States Space Shuttle program included Payload Specialist positions which were usually filled by representatives of companies or institutions managing a specific payload on that mission. These individuals did not receive the same level of training as the NASA Astronaut Corps and were private astronauts.

In the early days of the Shuttle program, NASA was also eager to prove its capability to Congressional sponsors, and Senator Jake Garn and Representative Bill Nelson were both given opportunities to fly on a Shuttle mission.

The National Aeronautics and Space Act of 1958 stated that NASA should provide the "widest practicable and appropriate dissemination of information concerning its activities and the results thereof". The Naugle panel of 1982 concluded that carrying civilians—those not NASA astronauts—on the shuttle was part of "the purpose of adding to the public's understanding of space flight". As the Shuttle program expanded, NASA developed the Space Flight Participant Program, where civilians, with an emphasis on creative people, would be sent into space to increase public awareness of NASA's mission. The initial goal was that two or three shuttle missions a year would include a civilian participant. The agency hoped that potential passengers such as Walter Cronkite and James Michener could "communicate" space to the public. The first would be the Teacher in Space Project, which would combine publicity and educational opportunities for NASA. Christa McAuliffe would have been the first Teacher in Space, but she was killed in the Challenger disaster and the program was canceled. At the time of the Challenger disaster, NASA was planning to include a Journalist in Space on a mission scheduled to launch in September 1986. The program continued briefly, with the initial candidate pool being narrowed to 100 in March and 40 in April before being postponed indefinitely in July.  Walter Cronkite and Miles O'Brien were considered front-runners.

With the realities of the post-perestroika economy in Russia, its space industry was especially starved for cash. The Tokyo Broadcasting System (TBS) offered to pay for one of its reporters to fly on a mission. For $28 million, Toyohiro Akiyama, was flown in 1990 to Mir with the eighth crew and returned a week later with the seventh crew. Akiyama gave a daily television broadcast from orbit and also performed scientific experiments for Russian and Japanese companies.

Since then, the Russian Federal Space Agency has also sold seats to a consortium of British companies for Project Juno, to seven self-funded space tourists, to the Malaysian government as part of a contract to sell military planes, and to the South Korean government as part of the Korean Astronaut Program.

List of spaceflight participants

The first eight space tourism trips went to and from the International Space Station on Soyuz spacecraft and were arranged through the space tourism company, Space Adventures.

Other missions
While not labeled as "spaceflight participants", the following people participated in NASA or Roscosmos spaceflight missions under the auspices of special programs outside the professional astronaut corps.

Private employers
People who flew into space as private sector employees - they were not necessarily considered spaceflight participants in their flights:

Notes 
1. Not always the case, since Marcos Pontes, trained in the NASA Group 17, was a spaceflight participant in the Soyuz TMA-8.

See also

Commercial astronaut

References

External links
Charles in Space Charles Simonyi's blog and video blog about his trip to the ISS.